National Institute of Ophthalmology may refer to:

 National Institute of Ophthalmology, India

See also
 National Institute of Ophthalmic Sciences, Malaysia